The 1910 Paris–Tours was the seventh edition of the Paris–Tours cycle race and was held on 25 September 1910. The race started in Paris and finished in Tours. The race was won by François Faber.

General classification

References

1910 in French sport
1910
September 1910 sports events